Gary G. Matthews (born February 10, 1951)  was the Speaker of the 59th Montana House of Representatives. He joined the United States Marine Corps before attending Miles Community College. He is a member of the Montana Democratic Party.

Education 
AA, Miles Community College, 1976

Political Experience 

 Representative, Montana State House of Representatives, 
 1998–present Former Speaker of the House,
 Montana State House of Representatives Member, Veterans A Redevelopment Project, 1999-2000

References

External links 
 Montana Legislative Branch Information Page on Matthews

Living people
Speakers of the Montana House of Representatives
Democratic Party members of the Montana House of Representatives
1951 births